Thomas Forster (fl. 1406–1415), of Lincoln, was an English politician.

He was elected Mayor of Lincoln for 1407–08 and a Member (MP) of the Parliament of England for Lincoln in 1406, May 1413 and 1415.

References

14th-century births
15th-century deaths
English MPs 1406
English MPs May 1413
English MPs 1415
Members of the Parliament of England (pre-1707) for Lincoln
Mayors of Lincoln, England